See also: List of reference tables

Mathematics 
List of mathematical topics
List of statistical topics
List of mathematical functions
List of mathematical theorems
List of mathematical proofs
List of matrices
List of numbers
List of relativistic equations
List of small groups
Mathematical constants
Sporadic group
Table of bases
Table of Clebsch-Gordan coefficients
Table of derivatives
Table of divisors
Table of integrals
Table of mathematical symbols
Table of prime factors
Taylor series
Timeline of mathematics
Trigonometric identities
Truth table

Reference tables
List